The 2016 Rally Argentina (formally the 36° YPF Rally Argentina) was the fourth round of the 2016 World Rally Championship. The race was held over four days between 21 April and 24 April 2016, and operated out of Córdoba, Argentina. Hyundai's Hayden Paddon won the race, his first win in the World Rally Championship.

Entry list

Overall standings

Special stages

Power Stage
The "Power stage" was a  stage at the end of the rally.

References

Argentina
Rally Argentina
Rally